Maamba is a town located in Sinazongwe District in the Southern Province, Zambia. It is about 35 kilometres south-west of Sinazeze and about 250 km south-west of the capital city of Zambia, Lusaka.

Maamba is a coal mining town with about 13000 residents.

History 
Maamba gets its name from the Lozi Tribe, meaning talkative person.

Maamba Coal Mine 
Maamba is the home to the largest Coal Plant in Zambia at 300MW, built for U$750million and operated by Maamba Collieries Limited (MCL)  which as of 2010 is 100% owned by Nava Bharat Ventures Limited (NVBL) of India.

In 2021, Maamba Collieries Limited announced they were interested in increasing the capacity from 300 to 600MW.

References 

Populated places in Southern Province, Zambia